Frank Gould Carver (May 27, 1928 – July 14, 2017) was an American scholar and professor of Biblical theology and Greek.

Carver was born in Crookston, Nebraska to Frank Alonzo and Greeta (née Gould). He earned his B.A. (1950) from Taylor University, his B.D. (1954) and Th.M. (1958) from Nazarene Theological Seminary, and his Ph.D. on the concept of koinonia (1964) from the University of Edinburgh. Carver was one of only three scholars who worked on both the original 1971 translation of the New American Standard Bible as well as the 1995 update. He served as professor emeritus at Point Loma Nazarene University from 1996.

Selected publications

Books

Edited by

Chapters

Journal articles

References

1928 births
2017 deaths
American biblical scholars
People from Cherry County, Nebraska
Taylor University alumni
Nazarene Theological Seminary alumni
Alumni of the University of Edinburgh
Point Loma Nazarene University faculty
New Testament scholars
Translators of the Bible into English
American expatriates in the United Kingdom
20th-century translators
20th-century Methodists